Katlyn Alicia Johnson Carreón (born 14 September 1994) is an American-born Mexican professional footballer who plays as a forward for National Women's Soccer League club Angel City FC and the Mexico women's national team.

Early life and education
Born and raised in Monrovia, California, a suburb of Los Angeles, Johnson is the daughter of an American father, Dennis Johnson, and a Mexican mother, Esther Carreón. Her sister, Isabelle, also played soccer for USC.

Johnson attended Flintridge Sacred Heart Academy in La Canada, California and was a high school All-American soccer player. She scored 57 goals during her high school career.

USC Trojans, 2012–2016
Johnson played forward for the USC Trojan's women's soccer team in the 2012, 2013, 2014, and 2016 seasons. She was injured and did not play in the 2015 season. During her four seasons she appeared in 83 games and scored 24 goals and had 6 assists. She was named the Most Outstanding Player on Offense in the 2016 College Cup, scoring the only goal in the semi-final and two goals in the final to lead USC to its second national championship in women's soccer.

Club career

Seattle Reign, 2017
On 12 January 2017, Johnson was selected by Seattle Reign FC as the 16th overall selection in the 2017 NWSL College Draft. She made her debut for the club in a match against the Houston Dash on April 22, 2017 and scored her first goal helping the Reign win 5–1. Mostly coming off the bench as a substitute she finished the season with four goals and two assists.

Sky Blue, 2018
In January 2018, Johnson was traded to Sky Blue FC. She was named Player of the Week for Week 21 of the 2018 NWSL season after scoring 2 goals in Sky Blue's 
2–2 draw against the Utah Royals.

Chicago Red Stars, 2019–2021
In January 2019, the Chicago Red Stars announced they had acquired Johnson from Sky Blue FC in exchange for the sixth overall pick and highest second-round pick in the 2020 NWSL College Draft.
 Johnson had her first appearance for the Red Stars as a substitute for Sam Kerr in the 46th minute of a 2–1 loss to the Portland Thorns in the 2019 Thorns Spring Invitational preseason tournament

San Diego Wave FC, 2022 
In December 2021, San Diego Wave FC announced it has acquired the rights to Mexican international Johnson, fellow Southern California native Makenzy Doniak and Kelsey Turnbow in a trade with the Chicago Red Stars. In exchange, the Red Stars received roster protection in the 2022 NWSL Expansion Draft plus allocation money.

International career
Through birth and descent, Johnson was eligible to play for either the United States or Mexico national teams, ultimately choosing to represent the latter at the senior level. She made her debut on 9 December 2015 in a 0–3 loss against Canada at the International Women's Football Tournament of Natal of that year.

Shortly after, Johnson appeared in two matches and scored one goal for the Mexico national team in the 2016 CONCACAF Women's Olympic Qualifying Championship. Mexico did not qualify to play in the Olympics. She scored the lone Mexican goal in Mexico's 4–1 friendly loss to the United States on 5 April 2018.

Johnson scored three goals at the 2018 Central American and Caribbean Games helping Mexico win the gold medal.

International goals
Scores and results list Mexico's goal tally first

See also
List of Mexico women's international footballers

References

External links 
 Seattle Reign FC player profile
 USC Trojans player profile
 

1994 births
Living people
Citizens of Mexico through descent
Mexican women's footballers
Women's association football forwards
Mexico women's international footballers
Mexican people of American descent
People from Monrovia, California
Sportspeople from Los Angeles County, California
Soccer players from California
American women's soccer players
USC Trojans women's soccer players
OL Reign draft picks
OL Reign players
NJ/NY Gotham FC players
Chicago Red Stars players
San Diego Wave FC players
National Women's Soccer League players
American sportspeople of Mexican descent